Galuut is a sum (district) of Bayankhongor Province in southern Mongolia. In 2006, its population was 4,012.

Climate

Galuut has a subarctic climate (Köppen climate classification Dwc) with mild summers and severely cold winters. Most precipitation falls in the summer as rain, with some snow in the adjacent months of May and September. Winters are very dry.

References

Populated places in Mongolia
Districts of Bayankhongor Province